The men's C-2 1000 metres competition of the canoeing event at the 2015 Southeast Asian Games was held on 6 June 2015 at the Marina Channel in Singapore.

Schedule
All times are Singapore Standard Time (UTC+08:00)

Results

References

External links

Men's C-2 1000 metres